Nazeer Ahmed Baghio (born 8 April 1955) is a Pakistani politician who was a member of the National Assembly of Pakistan, from 2008 to May 2018.

Early life
He was born on 8 April 1955.

Political career

He was elected to the National Assembly of Pakistan as a candidate of Pakistan Peoples Party (PPP) from Constituency NA-205 (Larkana cum-Kamber Shahdadkot) in 2008 Pakistani general election. He received 72,928 votes and defeated Altaf Hussain Unar.

He was re-elected to the National Assembly as a candidate of PPP from Constituency NA-205 (Larkana cum-Kamber Shahdadkot) in 2013 Pakistani general election. He received 65,720 votes and defeated an independent candidate, Safdar Ali Abbasi.

References

Living people
Pakistan People's Party politicians
Sindhi people
Pakistani MNAs 2013–2018
People from Sindh
1955 births
Pakistani MNAs 2008–2013